Roland Watson is a British journalist who is currently foreign editor for The Times.

He was educated at Eton College. He was previously political editor of The Times from 2010 to 2013, having joined The Times in 1998 as a political correspondent.

References

Year of birth missing (living people)
Living people
People educated at Eton College
The Times people